Dehiwala-Mount Lavinia Municipal Council (DMMC) is the local authority for the city of Dehiwala-Mount Lavinia in Sri Lanka. The Council is responsible for providing a variety of local public services including roads, sanitation, drains, housing, libraries, public parks and recreational facilities. It has 48 members elected under the mixed electoral system where 60% of members will be elected using first-past-the-post voting and the remaining 40% through closed list proportional representation.

History
The area covered by the present Dehiwala-Mount Lavinia Municipal Council was part of the Kingdom of Kotte. It comprised a number of villages, including Pepiliyana Nedimala, Attidiya and Kalubowila. The areas south of Dehiwala together with Ratmalana were one large expanse of marshland that was sparsely populated.

In the late 16th century the Kingdom of Kotte was ruled by the Portuguese controlled king, Dharmapala. The administrative structure of the area during this time was the Gansabha system as prevailed earlier. In the early 17th century, the Dutch brought a more organised administrative structure from which a broad based taxation and legal system evolved. In the 19th Century the British replaced this with a provincial administrative (Kachcheri) system, which led to the current form of local government developing.

In 1959 this area was extended and divided into nineteen wards and given municipal status because of its rapid urban growth and for administrative reasons.

Demographics
Dehiwala-Mount Lavinia Municipality area is a multi-religious, multi-ethnic, multi-cultural city.

Wards
Dehiwala-Mount Lavinia municipality is the second largest in Sri Lanka covering . It lies to the south of the Colombo Municipal Council area separated by the Dehiwala canal which acts as the northern boundary of the municipality. Borupana Road lies at the southern limits and Weras Ganga to the east.

There are 29 wards in the Dehiwala-Mount Lavinia Municipal Council.

Council

Mayors
Parties

Departments
The Dehiwala-Mount Lavinia Municipal Council comprises ten departments:

 Department of Administration
 Department of Finance
 Department of Engineers
 Department of Mechanical Engineers
 Department of Legal
 Department of Health and Solid Waste Magagement
 Department of Sport and Social Welfare
 Department of Electrical
 Department of Fire
 Department of Health

Election results

2018 local government election

References

External links
 Dehiwala-Mount Lavinia Municipal Council

1959 establishments in Ceylon
Municipal Council
Local authorities in Western Province, Sri Lanka
Municipal councils of Sri Lanka